The Cornell Daily Sun is an independent daily newspaper published in Ithaca, New York by students at Cornell University and hired employees.

The Sun features coverage of the university and its environs as well as stories from the Associated Press and UWIRE. It prints on weekdays when the university is open for academic instruction as a tabloid-sized daily. In addition to these regular issues, The Sun publishes a graduation issue and a freshman issue, which is mailed to incoming Cornell freshmen before their first semester. The paper is free on campus and online.

Aside from a few full-time production and business positions, The Sun is staffed by Cornell students and is fully independent of the university. It operates out of its own building in downtown Ithaca. The Sun is the twentieth-ranked college newspaper in the United States as of 2022, according to The Princeton Review.

History

The Cornell Sun was founded in 1880 by William Ballard Hoyt to challenge Cornell's original and leading publication, the weekly Cornell Era (founded 1868).

The Sun boasted in its opening paragraph: "We have no indulgence to ask, no favors to beg." 

The paper incorporated and changed to daily frequency, earning its longstanding boast "Ithaca's Only Morning Newspaper." In 1912 it added a second, "first collegiate member of the Associated Press."

Throughout its history, the publication has faced competition from The Cornell Review and the Ithaca Journal in the market for Cornell news and analysis.

Common features include "Cornell's 161 Faces," which highlights a diverse group of Cornell students and a Sex Column that appears every Thursday.

Following the shift of its main competitor, the Ithaca Journal, from evening to morning daily publication in 1996, The Sun changed its traditional front page slogan which, after several iterations, now states "Independent Since 1880." This period also marked a shift in The Suns content from national to local and university-related stories.

In January 2003, the Cornell Daily Sun Alumni Association purchased the former Elks Lodge in downtown Ithaca, erected 1916. Led by Stanley Chess, the founding president of the Association, John Schroeder '74, and Gary L. Rubin '72, the alumni completely renovated the building over the next several months. Now called the Cornell Daily Sun Building, it has housed the paper's offices since June 2003 and is coincidentally located next door to the Ithaca Journals offices.

In the fall semester of 2004, The Sun turned free and started featuring full-color front and back pages as part of a redesign in its layout. These moves were partially effected to boost circulation in response to Cornell's Student Assembly's decision to provide The New York Times and USA Today on campus for free to all undergraduate Cornell students.

On September 17, 2005, more than 370 Sun alumni and guests gathered in Manhattan to celebrate The Sun's 125th anniversary. Speakers included Kurt Vonnegut '43, Carl Leubsdorf '59, Sam Roberts '68, Jay Branegan '73, Howard A. Rodman '71, S. Miller Harris '44, and Jeremy Schaap '91. The emcee was Stan Chess '69. A 130th anniversary dinner was held on September 25, 2010.

Alumni

The Cornell Daily Sun Alumni Association, comprising former editors, managers and staff of the Cornell Daily Sun, exists to further journalism by Cornell University students.

The Sun claims over one dozen Pulitzer Prize winners and boasts a number of other prominent alumni, including:
 Tom Allon, sports editor – publisher; Manhattan Media owner
 Stephen Asprinio, food & wine columnist – restaurateur, sommelier, chef, and former Top Chef contestant
 Jim Axelrod, Sports Department – CBS News national correspondent and reporter
 Whitney Balliett, film critic – New Yorker jazz critic
 Victor Berlin, Business Board – information security expert and founder of the University of Fairfax
 Neil Best – sports journalist at Newsday
 Keri Blakinger – criminal justice author and journalist
 Jay Branegan, senior editor (1971–72) – 1976 Pulitzer Prize-winning journalist with The Chicago Tribune
 Dick Brass, associate editor (1971–72) – technology investor, executive, and pioneer; developed first electronic dictionary and thesaurus; responsible for development of ClearType and Open eBook
 Gordon G. Chang, editorial board – lawyer, author, and television pundit
 Stanley Chess, editor-in-chief (1968–69) – legal commentator and former bar review course executive
 Jeff Coplon, editor-in-chief (1972–73) - prolific author of biographies and other interesting stories
 S. E. Cupp, arts & entertainment editor – political commentator and author
 Allison Danzig – The New York Times sportswriter (1923–1968); author
 Charles Divine, news editor – poet and playwright
 Edward D. Eddy, editor-in-chief (1943–44) – president of Chatham College and the University of Rhode Island
 Bob Filner, Business Board – Mayor of San Diego; former Congressman
 Rob Fishman, columnist - entrepreneur and writer
 David Folkenflik, editor-in-chief (1990–91) – NPR reporter
 Frank E. Gannett, Sun Board – media mogul and founder of the Gannett Company, Inc.
 Jeffrey Gettleman, photographer – 2012 Pulitzer Prize-winning journalist; The New York Times East Africa Bureau Chief
 Davidson Goldin, editor-in-chief (1992–1993); PR firm owner, formerly: MSNBC executive, NY1 anchor, New York Times contributor 
 Joey Green, political cartoonist – humor author known as "The Pantry Professor"
Daniel Gross, News Board – financial and economic journalist; executive editor of strategy+business magazine
David Gura, News Board (2003–2006) – host of Up with David Gura on MSNBC
 John Hassell, managing editor (1990–91) – 2005 Pulitzer Prize-winning journalist with The Star-Ledger
 Lewis Henry, editor-in-chief (1908–09) – U.S. Congressman from New York
 Scott Jaschik, editor-in-chief (1984–85) – founder and editor of Inside Higher Ed
 Marvin Josephson, managing editor (1948–49) – founder, chair, and CEO of ICM Partners
 Lawrence Kasanoff, business manager – American film & television producer; co-founder of Lightstorm Entertainment and Threshold Entertainment with James Cameron
 Robert Kessler, editor-in-chief (1964–65) – 1997 Pulitzer Prize-winning journalist with Newsday
 Andrew Kopkind, editor-in-chief (1956–57) – noted journalist with Washington Post, The New Republic, and others
 Marc Lacey, editor-in-chief (1986–87) – The New York Times national editor; 1993 Pulitzer Prize-winning journalist with The Los Angeles Times
 Patrick LaForge, associate editor (1983-84) – The New York Times Editor, Breaking News Hub / Express Desk 
 Carl P. Leubsdorf, associate editor (1958–59) – The Dallas Morning News columnist; political journalist
 Harold O. Levy, columnist — New York City Schools Chancellor from 2000-2002, and executive director of the Jack Kent Cooke Foundation
 Eric Lichtblau, news reporter – 2006 Pulitzer Prize-winning journalist; The New York Times Washington bureau reporter
 Stuart Loory, editor-in-chief (1953–54) – journalist and academic; Chicago Sun-Times managing editor
 Farhad Manjoo, editor-in-chief (1999–2000) – journalist and author; New York Times technology writer and opinion columnist
 Joseph Masci, supplement editor – physician, educator and author
 Will Maslow, associate editor – lawyer and civil rights leader
 Oscar G. Mayer, Jr., business manager (1933–34) – executive of the Oscar Mayer meat company
 Phil Mazo, cartoonist – stand-up comedian
James C. McKinley Jr. – The New York Times journalist
 Anne Morrissy Merick, sports editor – pioneering Vietnam War journalist
 Philip Merrill, managing editor (1954–55) – diplomat, banker, and philanthropist; Export-Import Bank of the United States chairman
 Andrew Morse, editor-in-chief (1995–96) – Executive Vice President of CNN
 Svante Myrick, editorial board – Mayor of Ithaca, New York
 George Jean Nathan, editorial board – drama critic and editor, The American Mercury co-founder and editor
 Scot J. Paltrow, News Board – financial journalist
 Paul A. Rahe, associate editor – historian, writer and professor of history
 Jon Ralston, Sports Department – American journalist, political commentator, and talk show host
 Henry S. Reuss, editor-in-chief (1932–33) – U.S. Congressman from Wisconsin
 Sam Roberts, managing editor (1967–68) – The New York Times columnist, reporter, and editor; inaugural author of the "Metro Matters" column; author; biographer of David Greenglass and Nelson Rockefeller
 Howard A. Rodman, editor-in-chief (1970–71) – screenwriter and professor
 Wallace A. Ross, News Board – advertising executive and founder of the Clio Awards
 Kirkpatrick Sale, editor-in-chief (1957–58) – environmental and technology scholar and author; leader of secessionist movement
 Dick Schaap, editor-in-chief (1954–55) – noted sports writer and broadcaster
 Jeremy Schaap, sports editor (1990–91) – ESPN contributor and son of Dick Schaap
 Richard Schechner, news editor (1955), theatre reviewer (1956) -- author, editor, theatre director, professor NYU Tisch School of the Arts
 Danny Schechter – television producer, filmmaker, and media critic
 Alan Sisitsky - Massachusetts House of Representatives member and Massachusetts Senate Judiciary Committee chairman
 Deborah Solomon, associate editor – The New York Times magazine columnist; art critic; biographer
 Barry S. Strauss, feature editor (1973–74) – professor of history and classics at Cornell University; ancient military history author and expert
 Elmer E. Studley, editorial board – U.S. Congressman from New York
 Jacob Sullum, senior editor – syndicated newspaper columnist
 Molly O'Toole, news editor (2009) – inaugural recipient of the 2020 Pulitzer Prize for audio reporting 
Ronald Thwaites, editor-in-chief (1966–1967) – Jamaica Minister of Education (2012–2016) 
 Elbert Tuttle, editor-in-chief (1917–18) – Chief Judge of United States Court of Appeals for the Fifth Circuit; member of Fifth Circuit Four
 Kurt Vonnegut, associate editor (1942–43) – novelist and satirist
 Jamie Weinstein, columnist – political journalist and commentator
 E. B. White, editor-in-chief (1920–21) – columnist and author; 1978 Pulitzer Prize special award
David Wild, arts editor – TV and music writer and critic; Rolling Stone contributing editor
 Joseph J. Schatz, assistant sports editor (1998) – Managing editor for Politico
 Ed Zuckerman, editor-in-chief (1969–70) – Emmy Award-winning producer and writer for Law & Order, as well as episodes of Miami Vice, Star Trek: The Next Generation, JAG, and others

See also
 List of college newspapers
 Cornell University

References

 "From the Hill: Housing News: A Home for the Sun," Cornell Magazine, Vol. 105 No. 5, March/April 2003.
 Bishop, Morris. A History of Cornell. New York, New York: Cornell University Press, 1962. 
 Margulis, Daniel ed. A Century at Cornell: Published to Commemorate the Hundredth Anniversary of the Cornell Daily Sun. Ithaca, New York: Cornell Daily Sun, 1980.

External links 
 Cornell Daily Sun official site
 Cornell Daily Sun Alumni Association
 Cornell University Library, Cornell Daily Sun Digitization Project
 Sun Editorial Board

Cornell University publications
Student newspapers published in New York (state)
Publications established in 1880
1880 establishments in New York (state)